The SENS Research Foundation is a non-profit organization that does research programs and public relations work for the application of regenerative medicine to aging. It was founded in 2009, located in Mountain View, California, USA. The organization publishes its reports annually.

History 
Before the foundation was founded in March 2009, the SENS research program was mainly pursued by the Methuselah Foundation, co-founded by Aubrey de Grey and David Gobel.

When the SENS rejuvenation approach was announced in the 2000s, while some biogerontologists supported the SENS program, many contended that the ultimate goals of de Grey's programme were too speculative given the state of technology and referred to it as "fantasy rather than science". By the mid-2010s, the rejuvenation approach gained traction with multiple startup companies created from SENS research findings. In 2021 Michael Greve pledged another €300 million for rejuvenation biotechnology startup companies. In 2021, Underdog Pharmaceuticals, a startup company spun out from a research program at SENS Research Foundation, was awarded an Innovation Passport from the United Kingdom Medicines and Healthcare products Regulatory Agency, which intends to streamline the approval program of promising therapies. In August 2021, Aubrey de Grey was suspended from the foundation. The CEO of the SENS Research Foundation, Jim O’Neill left in the preceding July, at the same time de Grey was suspended.

Goals 
According to the organization site, its goal is to "help build the industry that will cure the diseases of aging". It funds research and uses outreach and education in order to expedite the various regenerative medicine research programs that go together to make the SENS project. The foundation also conducts its own student program SRF Education.

Research

Research programs 
The SENS Research Foundation (SRF) pursues research projects that correspond to the seven categories of cellular damage due to aging:

Research collaboration 
In addition to research undertaken in-house at the Research Center in Mountain View,  has also taken part in and/or selectively funded extramural research at various other institutions, including Yale University, Harvard University, Cambridge University, University of Texas, Rice University, and University of Arizona.

Research advisory board 
The SENS Research Foundation's research advisory board includes Pedro J. J. Alvarez, Anthony Atala, George Church, Judith Campisi, William A. Haseltine, Brian K. Kennedy, Jeanne Loring, María Blasco Marhuenda, Bruce Rittmann, Nadia Rosenthal, Rudolph E. Tanzi, Jan Vijg, Michael D. West, and Vladimir Skulachev.

Funding source 

Owing to the close relationship between SENS Foundation and Methuselah Foundation and their common activities, during reading articles and public reports there are sometimes misunderstanding about their budgets, directions and amounts of donations which can be distributed between these organizations for various purposes.

On December 9, 2010, Jason Hope, an entrepreneur based in Scottsdale, AZ, pledged a $500,000 donation.

In 2011, Aubrey de Grey inherited $16.5 million on the death of his mother. Of this he assigned $13 million to fund SENS research, which by 2013 had the effect of roughly doubling the SRF yearly budget to $4 million.

According SRF annual reports,
 in 2017 its income was $7,871,530 and expenses $3,915,682 ($2,146,412 on research, $920,533 on education, $172,380 on outreach, $676,534 on administration).
 in 2018 - unclear, the annual report doesn't contain this information.
 in 2019 its income was $2,683,611 and expenses $4,361,258 ($2,331,364 on research, $859,222 on education, $642,056 on outreach, $582,616 on administration).

The Pineapple Fund donated $2 million to SENS in 2017–18, that's in addition to $1 million donated to Methuselah Foundation.

Ethereum co-founder Vitalik Buterin donated $2.4 million in 2018. Then in 2020 Vitalik Buterin together with Sam Bankman-Fried and Haseeb Qureshi donated a total of $150,000 to SENS Research Foundation to combat aging and aging-related diseases at the choice of users of Twitter as a result of open voting.

In 2020, Oculus cofounder Michael Antonov donated $1 million, of which $600,000 was a matching donation.

See also
 Ending Aging
 Buck Institute for Research on Aging
 Life Extension Advocacy Foundation
 Methuselah Foundation

References

External links

 

Regenerative biomedicine
Biogerontology organizations
Life extension organizations
Non-profit organizations based in California
Organizations established in 2009